Events from the year 1743 in Great Britain.

Incumbents
 Monarch – George II
 Prime Minister – Spencer Compton, 1st Earl of Wilmington (Whig) (until 2 July); Henry Pelham (Whig) (starting 27 August)
 Parliament – 9th

Events
 21 February – premiere in London of George Frideric Handel's oratorio, Samson.
 2 March – War of Jenkins' Ear: Battle of La Guaira – A British expeditionary fleet under Sir Charles Knowles is defeated by the Spanish off the South American coast.
 13 April – British East India Company ship Princess Louisa is wrecked off the coast of Maio Island in the Cape Verde Islands, killing 49 of her 179 crew.
 16 June (27 June New Style) – War of the Austrian Succession: The Battle of Dettingen is fought in Bavaria. King George II leads the troops of Britain and Brunswick to victory over the French – the last time a reigning British monarch participates in a battle. The Prime Minister, Spencer Compton, Earl of Wilmington, is also present, observing from a carriage. George Frideric Handel writes the oratorio Dettingen Te Deum in celebration of the King's victory.
 13 July – all 276 people on board the Dutch East India Company ship Hollandia drown after the ship strikes a rock off Annet, Isles of Scilly.
 20 July – Lord Anson captures the Philippine galleon Nuestra Señora de Covadonga and its treasure of 1,313,843 Spanish dollars at Manila.
 14 August – Great Fire of Crediton in Devon.
 27 August – Henry Pelham becomes Prime Minister, following the death of Spencer Compton, Earl of Wilmington, on 2 July.
 13 September – Treaty of Worms signed between Great Britain, the Holy Roman Emperor and the Kingdom of Sardinia.
 25 October – France and Spain form the Alliance of Fontainebleau with the aim of recapturing Gibraltar from Britain.
 11 December – Princess Louise, the King's daughter, marries Frederick, Crown Prince of Denmark and Norway.

Undated
 Gin Act 1743 attempts to increase taxation on gin provoking riots in London.
 Dr Christopher Packe produces the first geological map of south-east England.
 Last wolf said to be killed in Scotland.
 William Hogarth begins painting his Marriage à-la-mode series.

Publications
 Robert Blair's poem The Grave is published.
 The final edition of Alexander Pope's The Dunciad is published.

Births
 1 January – William Parker, admiral (died 1802)
 13 February – Joseph Banks, naturalist and botanist (died 1820)
 14 March – Hannah Cowley, dramatist and poet (died 1809)
 24 April – Edmund Cartwright, clergyman and inventor of the power loom (died 1823)
 July – William Paley, philosopher (died 1805)

Deaths
 4 April – Daniel Neal, English historian (born 1678)
 23 May – Thomas Archer, baroque architect (born 1668)
 2 July – Spencer Compton, 1st Earl of Wilmington, Prime Minister of Great Britain (born 1674)
 1 August – Richard Savage, writer (born c. 1697)
 5 August – John Hervey, 2nd Baron Hervey, English statesman and writer (born 1696)
 23 August – Mary Edwards, heiress (born 1705)
 4 October – John Campbell, 2nd Duke of Argyll, Scottish soldier (born 1678)
 5 October – Henry Carey, poet, dramatist and songwriter, suicide (born 1687)

References

 
Years in Great Britain